Raoul Armand Jerzy (von) Koczalski (3 January 1884 – 24 November 1948) was a Polish pianist and composer. He also used the pseudonym Georg Armand(o) Koczalski.

Career
Born in Warsaw, Koczalski was taught first by his mother, then by Julian Gadomski (1888–1890). Having made his first public appearance in 1888 (aged 4), his parents took him to play for Anton Rubinstein, who foresaw the possibility of a performing career. He never studied at a conservatory but had further private lesson on the piano and in composition with Ludwig Marek (1891–1892), Karol Mikuli (1893–1895) (Chopin's favorite Polish student and assistant) and instrumentation with Henryk Jarecki (1893–1894). At the age of 7 he gave concerts, and at 9 he was playing in major European cities as a virtuoso. His thousandth concert was given in Leipzig in 1896, and by the age of 12 he had received awards such as the Order of the Lion and Sun (from the Shah of Persia), the title of Court Pianist (from the King of Spain), and a medal from the Turkish Sultan. Already as a child he had a very extensive repertoire. During World War I he was interned in Bad Nauheim, Germany.

Koczalski was highly esteemed as a performer of Chopin in Germany, where he lived during the 1920s and 1930s. During these years he also wrote many reviews, using his pseudonym, founded a music school that went bankrupt, and reestablished himself as a concert pianist by 1934. He toured in France, Italy and Poland, but (despite many invitations) not in the United States for reasons of health. During World War II he was again interned (in Berlin), and in 1945 he went to live in Poznań, accepting a post as professor in the State Higher School of Music.

As a performer, the complete works of Chopin and the complete Beethoven sonatas lay at the core of a very extensive repertoire from the classical and romantic genres. He was considered one of the greatest interpreters of Chopin's music and one of the greatest pianists of his time, with a very liquid technique, smooth balance and interpretations that did not take the liberties of many of his contemporaries, remaining closer to the written score. According to Seidle (2003), "(h)is playing avoids extremes, is clear, colourful, with flowing, subtle phrasing and broad dynamics". ("Sein Spiel meidet Extreme, ist klar, farbig, mit fließender, subtiler Phrasierung und breiter Dynamik.") His pupils included Detlef Kraus, Monique de La Bruchollerie, Hanna Rudnicka-Kruszewska, Wanda Losakiewicz and Irena Wyrzykowska-Mondelska.

Koczalski died in Poznań aged 64.

Works
Koczalski's compositions include nearly 200 published works, symphonic and chamber pieces, concertos, operas and ballets, piano compositions and songs.

 Symphonische Legende vom Könige Boleslaus dem Kühnen und Bischof Stanislaus dem Heiligen (im Jahre 1079), for orchestra (1894) (Leipzig: Pabst, c.1900).
 Rymond, opera in 3 acts (6 scenes), libretto by Alexander Graf Predro (premiere, 14 October 1902, Elberfeld), (Leipzig: Pabst, 1902).
 Die Sühne, a "Trauerspiel" (tragedy) in 1 act, (premiere, 1909 Mulhouse (Leipzig: Pabst, c.1907).
 24 Preludes, Op. 65
 Piano Concerto, Op. 83
 Rilke-Heft; 4 songs on texts by Rainer Maria Rilke, Op. 102
 Rilke-Heft; 4 songs on texts by Rainer Maria Rilke, Op. 116
 Semrud. A Tale from the Orient, in 5 scenes and a prelude (text based on stories from The Thousand and One Nights, some dramatic sketches by Benno Ziegler, and the comic opera Der betrogene Kadi by Ch. W. Gluck), Op. 118
 Aus dem west-östlichen Divan, 21 poems by Goethe set as songs and duets for soprano and baritone, Op. 121 (Berlin: Koczalski, 1937)
 Legende No. 1, Op. 127
 Piano Sonata No. 8, Op. 143 (Poznań: Koczalski, c.1940)
 Sonatina for piano, Op. 146
 3 Nocturnes, Op. 147

Writings
In addition to his books, Koczalski wrote several press articles.
 Raoul Koczalski: Zum hundertsten Geburtstag Frédéric Chopins: Chopin-Zyklus; vier Klaviervorträge nebst einer biographischen Skizze: F. Chopin, sowie den Aufsätzen: Chopin als Komponist und Chopin als Pianist, und einer eingehenden Analyse aller zum Vortrag bestimmten Werke (Leipzig: Pabst, 1909).
 Raoul Koczalski: Frédéric Chopin: Betrachtungen, Skizzen, Analysen (Cologne: Tischer & Jagenberg, 1936).
 Raoul Koczalski: Betrachtungen eines "lebenslänglichen" Künstlers (Berlin, 1937).

Discography
 2017 – Chamber Works vol. 1 – Acte Préalable AP0383.
 2017 – Piano Concertos vol. 1 – Acte Préalable AP0501.
 2018 – Piano Concertos vol. 2 – Acte Préalable AP0502.
 2019 – Piano Concertos vol. 3 – Acte Préalable AP0503.
 2018 – String Concertos – Acte Préalable AP0504.
 2019 – Complete Songs vol. 1 – Acte Préalable AP0601.
 2020 – Chamber Works vol. 2 – Acte Préalable AP0476.

Sources
 Bernhard Vogel: Raoul Koczalski. Skizze (Leipzig: Pabst, 1896).
 Marja Paruszewska: Szkic biograficzny i artystyczna karjera Raula Koczalskiego (Poznań, 1936).
 Stanisław Dybowski: Raul Koczalski. Chopinista i kompozytor (Warszawa: Selene, 1998), .
 Stanisław Dybowski: Słownik pianistów polskich (Warszawa: Selene, 2003).
 Teresa Brodniewicz, H.Kostrzewskiej, J. Tatarskiej: Raul Koczalski (Poznań: Akademia Muzyczna im. Ignacego Jana Paderewskiego w Poznaniu, 2001), .
 Mała encyklopedia muzyki, praca zbiorowa (Warszawa: PWN, 1981).
 Mała Encyklopedia muzyki, pod red. Józefa Władysława Reissa (Warszawa: PWN, 1960).

References

External links 
 Scores by Raoul Koczalski in digital library Polona

1884 births
1948 deaths
19th-century male musicians
20th-century classical pianists
20th-century male musicians
Composers for piano
Male classical pianists
Music & Arts artists
Polish classical pianists
Polish composers
Polish male classical composers
Polish opera composers
Polish Romantic composers